HMS Chiddingfold (L31) was a Type II  destroyer of the Royal Navy. She was leased to the Indian Navy in 1952 where she served  as INS Ganga (D94).

Construction and design
Chiddingfold was one of 17 Hunt-class destroyers ordered from various shipbuilders on 4 September 1939. The Hunts were meant to fill the Royal Navy's need for a large number of small destroyer-type vessels capable of both convoy escort and operations with the fleet. The Type II Hunts differed from the earlier ships in having increased beam in order to improve stability and carry the ships' originally intended armament.

Chiddingfold was laid down at Scotts Shipbuilding and Engineering Company's shipyard at Greenock on the River Clyde on 1 March 1940 as Job No. J1115, was launched on 10 March  1941, and was completed on 16 October that year. Chiddingfold was the first ship of the Royal Navy to have that name, and was named after the after the fox hunt at Petworth, Sussex. 

Displacement was  standard and   under full load.

The ship's main gun armament was six 4 inch (102 mm) QF Mk XVI dual purpose (anti-ship and anti-aircraft) guns in three twin mounts, with one mount forward and two aft. Additional close-in anti-aircraft armament was provided by a quadruple 2-pounder "pom-pom" mount and two single Oerlikon 20 mm cannon mounted in the bridge wings. Power-operated twin 20 mm Oerlikon mounts replaced the single Oerlikons during the war. Up to 110 depth charges could be carried. The ship had a complement of 168 officers and men.

History in the Royal Navy
She earned battle honours in World War II for Norway, 1941 and English Channel, 1945.

Following the war, she was reduced to Reserve status early in 1946 and laid-up on 25 March 1946. In 1950 she was transferred to the Reserve Fleet at Harwich and remained there until 1952 when she was towed to Liverpool for a refit.

History in the Indian Navy

The lease of Chiddingfold to India was announced on 17 June 1952. She underwent a refit by Messrs Crichton at Liverpool which was completed in June 1953.

She was commissioned as INS Ganga on 18 June 1953. The lease was extended in August 1956, and she was sold to India in April 1958. Along with two other Hunt-class destroyers in Indian service (Godavari and Gomati), she constituted the 22nd Destroyer Squadron.

She was deployed as a training ship until 1975, when she was struck from the active list, before being sold for scrapping.

Notes

References

Publications
 
 
 
 
 
 
 

 

Hunt-class destroyers of the Indian Navy
1941 ships
Hunt-class destroyers of the Royal Navy